Priyanka Pawar (born 3 April 1988) is an athlete from India. She won gold medal in women's 4 x 400 metres relay at the 2014 Asian Games in Incheon, South Korea along with Tintu Lukka, Mandeep Kaur and M. R. Poovamma. The team clocked 3:28:68 to break the Games Record. This is India's 4th consecutive gold in the event since 2002.

Controversies

Doping scandal
Priyanka Panwar and five other athletes tested positive for anabolic steroids in the dope tests conducted on 27 June 2011 by NADA at NIS Patiala and consequently banned for a year. In June 2016 she was tested positive on Mephentermine and later suspended for eight years.

Sexual harassment
On 16 February 2011, Priyanka Pawar's father Shiv Kumar Pawar alleged that her railways team in charge Anu Singh is sexually harassing her. The railway employee's family filed complaints with the railway and sports ministries accusing Pawar of making false allegations against him view to pressuring the team official to get Priyanka's younger brother Arun Panwar, who was earlier rejected by Singh, into the Uttar Pradesh juniors 200-metre sprint team.

References

Athletes (track and field) at the 2014 Asian Games
Asian Games medalists in athletics (track and field)
1988 births
Living people
Doping cases in athletics
Asian Games gold medalists for India
Medalists at the 2014 Asian Games